Thorntree, also known as the Witherspoon House, is a historic plantation house located at Kingstree, Williamsburg County, South Carolina.  It was built in 1749 by immigrant James Witherspoon (1700-1765), and is a two-story, five-bay, frame "I-house" dwelling with a hall and parlor plan and exterior end chimneys.  It features full-length piazzas on the front and rear elevations. To preserve it, the house was moved from an inaccessible rural site to Kingstree on land donated as a memorial park, known as Fluitt-Nelson Memorial Park. The house has been restored to its 18th-century appearance and is open to the public by appointment with the Williamsburg Historical Society.

It was listed in the National Register of Historic Places in 1970.

References

Plantation houses in South Carolina
Houses on the National Register of Historic Places in South Carolina
Houses completed in 1749
Houses in Williamsburg County, South Carolina
National Register of Historic Places in Williamsburg County, South Carolina
Historic house museums in South Carolina